Mahvid Mosque is related to the Qajar dynasty and is located in Mahvid, Ferdows County.

References 

Mosques in Iran
Mosque buildings with domes
National works of Iran